The Optional Protocol to the International Covenant on Economic, Social and Cultural Rights is an international treaty establishing complaint and inquiry mechanisms for the International Covenant on Economic, Social and Cultural Rights. It was adopted by the UN General Assembly on 10 December 2008, and opened for signature on 24 September 2009. As of October 2018, the Protocol has 46 signatories and 26 state parties. It entered into force on 5 May 2013.

Genesis

In 1966, the United Nations General Assembly adopted the International Covenant on Economic, Social and Cultural Rights. The Covenant obliged its parties to recognise and progressively implement economic, social, and cultural rights, including labour rights and right to health, right to education, and right to an adequate standard of living, but did not include any mechanism by which these obligations could be legally enforced.

Work on an individual complaints mechanism began in 1990, with a view to developing an Optional Protocol similar to those of other UN human rights instruments. Development was encouraged by the 1993 World Conference on Human Rights, which recommended the Commission on Human Rights and CESCR to "continue examination of optional protocols" to the ICESCR.

CESCR presented the first draft Optional Protocol in 1997. In 2002, the committee established an open-ended working group to continue development. In 2006, the Human Rights Council gave the open-ended working group the task of formally negotiating a draft text. Negotiations were completed in April 2008, and the resulting Optional Protocol was formally adopted by the UN General Assembly on 10 December 2008. It was opened for signature on 24 September 2009.

Summary

The Optional Protocol establishes an individual complaints mechanism for the Covenant similar to those of the First Optional Protocol to the International Covenant on Civil and Political Rights, Optional Protocol to the Convention on the Rights of Persons with Disabilities and Article 14 of the Convention on the Elimination of All Forms of Racial Discrimination.  Parties agree to recognise the competence of the Committee on Economic, Social and Cultural Rights to consider complaints from individuals or groups who claim their rights under the Covenant have been violated. Complainants must have exhausted all domestic remedies, and anonymous complaints and complaints referring to events which occurred before the country concerned joined the Optional Protocol are not permitted. The committee can request information from and make recommendations to a party. Parties may also opt to permit the committee to hear complaints from other parties, rather than just individuals.

The Protocol also includes an inquiry mechanism. Parties may permit the committee to investigate, report on and make recommendations on "grave or systematic violations" of the Covenant. Parties may opt out of this obligation on signature or ratification.

The Optional Protocol required ten ratifications to come into force.

See also
 International Covenant on Economic, Social and Cultural Rights
 First Optional Protocol to the International Covenant on Civil and Political Rights
 Optional Protocol to the Convention on the Elimination of All Forms of Discrimination against Women
 Optional Protocol to the Convention on the Rights of Persons with Disabilities

References

External links
 Text of the Optional Protocol
 Committee on Economic, Social and Cultural Rights, the Covenant's monitoring body
 List of signatories and ratifications

Human rights instruments
United Nations treaties
Optional Protocol to the International Covenant on Economic, Social and Cultural Rights
Optional Protocol to the International Covenant on Economic, Social and Cultural Rights
Treaties of Argentina
Treaties of Belgium
Treaties of Bolivia
Treaties of Bosnia and Herzegovina
Treaties of Cape Verde
Treaties of the Central African Republic
Treaties of Costa Rica
Treaties of Ecuador
Treaties of El Salvador
Treaties of Finland
Treaties of France
Treaties of Gabon
Treaties of Italy
Treaties of Luxembourg
Treaties of Mongolia
Treaties of Montenegro
Treaties of Niger
Treaties of Portugal
Treaties of San Marino
Treaties of Slovakia
Treaties of Spain
Treaties of Uruguay
Treaties of Venezuela
2008 in New York City
Treaties adopted by United Nations General Assembly resolutions